The 2010–11 BYU Cougars men's basketball team represented Brigham Young University in the 2010–11 college basketball season. This was head coach Dave Rose's sixth season at BYU. The Cougars, in their final season in the Mountain West Conference, played their home games at the Marriott Center. The Cougars ended regular season play as co-champions with San Diego State, and were the only team to defeat the Aztecs in regular-season play. Led by combo guard Jimmer Fredette, the nation's leading scorer and consensus national player of the year, the Cougars advanced to the Sweet Sixteen of the NCAA tournament, where they lost  in overtime to Florida.

This was the Cougars' final season as a member of the Mountain West as their basketball team became a member of the West Coast Conference in July 2011.

Roster

Schedule and results
Source

|-
!colspan=9 style=|Exhibition

|-
!colspan=9 style=| Regular Season

|-
!colspan=10 style= | Mountain West tournament

|-
!colspan=10 style= | NCAA Tournament

Rankings

*AP does not release post-NCAA Tournament rankings.

The team has consistently been ranked higher in computer rankings such as Jeff Sagarin's than in the AP and Coaches Polls.  On  November 13, 2010 they were ranked 2 in Sagarin's rankings, while they were ranked as high as 1 in Ratings Percentage Index (RPI) on January 9 and 24, 2011, as well as on February 15 and 28, 2011.

Davies controversy
Sophomore starting forward Brandon Davies was dismissed from the team on March 1, 2011 for the remainder of the season for a violation of the school's honor code. The Salt Lake Tribune published that the transgression involved the provision that prohibits premarital sex. This led to a media frenzy in which the Honor Code was spotlighted and debated, particularly because Davies had not committed a criminal act, or even an NCAA violation, but instead a violation of Mormon and school ethics. Davies had started 26 of 29 games for the Cougars, averaging 11.1 points and a team-leading 6.2 rebounds. At the time, BYU had a 27-2 record and ranked No. 3 nationally, while analyst Joe Lunardi of ESPN.com had projected the Cougars as the No. 1 seed in the West region for the 2011 NCAA tournament. After Davies' suspension, Lunardi maintained his stance that BYU should be a No. 1 seed as long as they continued to perform. The Cougars lost their next game 82–64 to New Mexico (19–11), who beat BYU for the second time in the season, but quickly recovered in a 102-78 victory over Wyoming.

References

BYU Cougars men's basketball seasons
BYU
BYU
BYU Cougars men's basketball
BYU Cougars men's basketball